Gillberg may refer to:

 Carina Gillberg or Christopher Gillberg, who published a set of diagnostic criteria for Asperger's Syndrome (known) as Gillberg and Gillberg
 Gillberg (wrestler), American professional wrestler
 the Gillberg Hundred, a historical administrative subdivision